Thomas Henry Hirst (21 May 1865 – 3 April 1927) was an English first-class cricketer, who played against Somerset for Yorkshire County Cricket Club, in a drawn match at The Circle, Kingston upon Hull, in 1899.  

Hirst was born in Lockwood, Huddersfield, Yorkshire, England, and was a right-handed batsman.  He scored a total of 66 runs with best scores of 33 and 28 in Scotland's draw against the Australians. Hirst took a catch, but his right arm fast medium pace failed to take a wicket, while conceding 44 runs.  He batted at number eleven in his first game, and at number one in his second.

Hirst died in April 1927 in Meltham, Yorkshire.

References

Cricinfo Profile

1865 births
1927 deaths
Yorkshire cricketers
Cricketers from Huddersfield
English cricketers